Akbar Ali (3 March 1925 – 21 February 2016) was an Indian Kannada poet from Karnataka, India. On 28 July 1986, Governor nominated him as the Member of Karnataka Legislative Council (1986 - 1992).

Early life and background 
Akbar Ali was born to Ameerbi and Appa Saheb from Ullagaddi village of Khanapur, Belgaum district. He started writing poems from his school days and the poem "Sumana Somabha" was awarded by the State Sahitya Academy. 

Ali served as a college lecturer for 14 years at Arts and Science College, Karwar, Lecturer for 10 years at The Institute of Correspondence Course and Continuing Education, Mysore University.

Career 
He was awarded the Sumana Saurabha - Karnataka State Sahitya Academy award in 1967 and 1984. In 1986, he became a Member of the Karnataka Vidhan Parishad (Legislative Council).

Death 
In February 2016, Ali died of thyroid cancer at his residence in Kuvempunagar. He is survived by three sons and three daughters.

References

Kannada poets
Kannada-language writers
Educators from Karnataka
1925 births
2016 deaths
20th-century Indian Muslims
People from Belagavi district
Members of the Karnataka Legislative Council
Recipients of Bangla Academy Award
Poets from Karnataka
20th-century Indian poets
Indian male poets
20th-century Indian educators
20th-century Indian male writers